Aimé Cassayet-Armagnac (9 April 1893 – 26 May 1927) was a French rugby union player who competed in the 1924 Summer Olympics. He was born in Tarbes and died suddenly in Narbonne after suffering acute peritonitis followed by meningitis. In 1924 he won the silver medal as a member of the French team.

References

External links
 
 
 

1893 births
1927 deaths
French rugby union players
Olympic rugby union players of France
Rugby union players at the 1924 Summer Olympics
Olympic silver medalists for France
France international rugby union players
Medalists at the 1924 Summer Olympics
Sportspeople from Tarbes
Rugby union locks
Rugby union number eights